Giulia Tanno (born 5 May 1998) is a Swiss freestyle skier specializing in slopestyle and big air disciplines. She won a bronze medal in big air at Winter X Games XXI in Aspen.

References

External links
 
 

1998 births
Living people
Swiss female snowboarders
21st-century Swiss women